Chatham was a parliamentary constituency in Kent which returned one Member of Parliament (MP) to the House of Commons of the Parliament of the United Kingdom.  It was created for the 1832 general election, when the borough of Chatham was enfranchised under the Reform Act 1832.

It was abolished for the 1950 general election, when it was largely replaced by the new Rochester and Chatham constituency. This then became Medway in 1983.  When the boroughs of Rochester upon Medway and Gillingham merged to form the larger unitary Borough of Medway in 1998, the Parliamentary constituency of Medway only covered part of the new borough, so for the 2010 election it was renamed Rochester and Strood.

Boundaries
1918–1950: The Borough of Rochester except part of St Peter's ward, and the Borough of Chatham wards of Luton and St John.

Members of Parliament

Elections

Elections in the 1830s

Maberly resigned on appointment as a Commissioner of Customs, causing a by-election.

Elections in the 1840s

Elections in the 1850s

The election was declared void on petition, due to bribery, causing a by-election.

Elections in the 1860s

Elections in the 1870s

Elliot resigned, causing a by-election.

Elections in the 1880s

Gorst was appointed Solicitor General for England and Wales, requiring a by-election.

Elections in the 1890s

Elections in the 1900s

Elections in the 1910s

Elections in the 1920s

Elections in the 1930s

The sitting MP Sydney Frank Markham sought re-election as a National Labour candidate. However, the Conservatives refused to withdraw in his favour. As a result, he was forced to withdraw. Communist candidate Walter Hannington was also adopted but subsequently withdrew.

Elections in the 1940s

References 

Politics of Medway
Parliamentary constituencies in Kent (historic)
Constituencies of the Parliament of the United Kingdom established in 1832
Constituencies of the Parliament of the United Kingdom disestablished in 1950
Chatham, Kent